In mathematics, especially in algebraic number theory, the Hermite–Minkowski theorem states that for any integer N there are only finitely many number fields, i.e., finite field extensions K of the rational numbers Q, such that the discriminant of K/Q is at most N.  The theorem is named after Charles Hermite and Hermann Minkowski.

This theorem is a consequence of the estimate for the discriminant

 

where n is the degree of the field extension, together with Stirling's formula for n!. This inequality also shows that the discriminant of any number field strictly bigger than Q is not ±1, which in turn implies that Q has no unramified extensions.

References
 Section III.2

Theorems in algebraic number theory